GJ 1151 is a star located in the northern circumpolar constellation of Ursa Major at a distance of 26.2 light years from the Sun. It has a reddish hue and is too faint to be visible to the naked eye with an apparent visual magnitude of 14.0 The star is moving closer with a radial velocity of −36 km/s, and has a relatively large proper motion, traversing the celestial sphere at a rate of ·yr−1.

This is a small red dwarf star of spectral type dM4.5. It is 2.5 billion years old and is spinning with a projected rotational velocity of 2.0 km/s. The star has 15.4% of the mass of the Sun and 19.0% of the Sun's radius, with an effective temperature of 3,143 K.

Planetary system
In 2020, astronomers announced the discovery of radio emissions from the star which are consistent with the star having a magnetic interaction with a planet approximately the size of Earth, revolving in a 1-5 day long orbit. Such an interaction would be analogous to a scaled-up version of the Jupiter-Io magnetic interaction, with GJ 1151 taking the role of Jupiter and its planet the role of Io.

Two papers published only a month apart in 2021 discussed planet detection at GJ 1151 by the radial velocity method.

This new planet is referred to by the discovery paper as GJ 1151 b, but it is possible that other sources will refer to it as GJ 1151 c to differentiate it from the previous candidate.

See also
List of star systems within 20–25 light-years

References

M-type main-sequence stars
Ursa Major (constellation)
J11505787+4822395
1151
Hypothetical planetary systems